Julius Johannes Weiland (ca. 1605 – 2 April 1663) was a minor German composer.

He was a singer and harpsichordist at the Wolfenbüttel court at the time of Augustus the Younger, Duke of Brunswick-Wolfenbüttel. With Johann Jacob Löwe (1628–1703), organist at Eisenach, he published Zweyer gleichgesinnten Freunde Tugend- und Schertz Lieder (1657). He died in Wolfenbüttel.

The small number of surviving works include:
 Salve Jesu 3 voices, 2 violins and basso continuo,
 Veni sancte spiritus a 6,
 Factum est proelium magnum.

References

External links

German Baroque composers
1605 births
1663 deaths
Year of birth uncertain
17th-century classical composers
German male classical composers
17th-century male musicians